Okladnensky is a rural locality (a khutor) and the administrative center of Okladnenskoye Rural Settlement, Uryupinsky District, Volgograd Oblast, Russia. The population was 263 as of 2010. There are 5 streets.

Geography 
Okladnensky is located in steppe, 20 km southeast of Uryupinsk (the district's administrative centre) by road. Fedotovsky is the nearest rural locality.

References 

Rural localities in Uryupinsky District